Philippe Ariès (21 July 1914 – 8 February 1984) was a French medievalist and historian of the family and childhood, in the style of Georges Duby. He wrote many books on the common daily life. His most prominent works regarded the change in the western attitudes towards death.

Work

Ariès was a pioneer in the field of cultural history, the "history of mentalities" as it was called, which flourished from the 1960s to 1980s and dealt with the themes and concerns of ordinary people going about their lives. He focused on the changing nature of childhood from the 15th to the 18th century in his Centuries of Childhood. Overall, his contribution was about placing family life into the context of a larger historical narrative, and the evolution of a distinction between public and private life in the modern era.

During his life, his work was often better known in the English-speaking world than it was in France itself. He is known above all for his book L’Enfant et la Vie Familiale sous l’Ancien Régime (1960), which was translated into English as Centuries of Childhood (1962). This book is pre-eminent in the history of childhood, as it was essentially the first book on the subject (although some antiquarian texts were earlier). Even today, Ariès remains the standard reference to the topic. Ariès is most famous for his statement that "in medieval society, the idea of childhood did not exist". Its central thesis is that attitudes towards children were progressive and evolved over time with economic change and social advancement, until childhood, as a concept and an accepted part of family life, from the 17th century. It was thought that children were too weak to be counted and that they could disappear at any time. However, children were considered as adults as soon as they could live alone.

The book has had mixed fortunes. His contribution was profoundly significant both in that it recognised childhood as a social construction rather than as a biological given and in that it founded the history of childhood as a serious field of study. At the same time, his account of childhood has by now been widely criticised.

Ariès is likewise remembered for his invention of another field of study: the history of attitudes to death and dying. Ariès saw death, like childhood, as a social construction. His seminal work in this ambit is L'Homme devant la mort (1977), his last major book, published in the same year when his status as a historian was finally recognised by his induction into the École des hautes études en sciences sociales (EHESS), as a directeur d'études.

Personal life 

Ariès regarded himself as an "anarchist of the right". He was initially close to the Action française but later distanced himself from it, as he viewed it as too authoritarian, hence his self-description as an "anarchist". Ariès also contributed to La Nation française, a royalist review. However, he also co-operated with many left-wing French historians, especially with Michel Foucault, who wrote his obituary.

Works
 1943. Les Traditions sociales dans les pays de France, Éditions de la Nouvelle France.
 1948. Histoire des populations françaises et de leurs attitudes devant la vie depuis le XVIIIe, Self.
 1949. Attitudes devant la vie et devant la mort du XVIIe au XIXe, quelques aspects de leurs variations, INED.
 1953. Sur les origines de la contraception en France, from Population 3 (July–September): pp. 465–72.
 1954. Le Temps de l'histoire, Éditions du Rocher.
 1954. Deux contributions à l'histoire des pratiques contraceptives, from Population 4 (October–December): pp. 683–98.
 1960. L'Enfant et la vie familiale sous l'Ancien Régime, Plon. English translation: 
 1975. Essais sur l'histoire de la mort en Occident: du Moyen Âge à nos jours, Seuil. English translation: 
 1977. L'Homme devant la mort, Seuil. English translation: 
 1980. Un historien du dimanche (with Michel Winock), Seuil.
 1983. Images de l'homme devant la mort, Seuil.
 1985–1987. Histoire de la vie privée, (with Georges Duby), 5 volumes: I. De l'Empire romain à l'an mil; II. De l'Europe féodale à la Renaissance; III. De la Renaissance aux Lumières; IV. De la Révolution à la Grande guerre; V. De la Première Guerre mondiale à nos jours, Seuil. 
 1993. Essais de mémoire: 1943–1983, Seuil.
 1997. Le présent quotidien, 1955–1966, Seuil. Collection of articles published in La Nation française between 1955 and 1966.
 2001. Histoire de la vie privée, (with Georges Duby), le Grand livre du mois.

References

Further reading 

Boyd, Kelly, ed. Encyclopedia of Historians and Historical Writers (Rutledge, 1999)  1:50-51
 
Evans, Richard J., In Defence of History, Granta Books 1997
Gros, Guillaume, "Philippe Ariès. Un traditionaliste non-conformiste, de l'Action française à l'Ecole des hautes études en sciences sociales", Presses Universitaires du Septentrion, 2008.

External links 
 Site dedicated to Philippe Ariès 

1914 births
1984 deaths
Writers from Blois
People affiliated with Action Française
History of childhood
Scholars of childhood
20th-century French historians
Lycée Janson-de-Sailly alumni
Academic staff of the School for Advanced Studies in the Social Sciences